The Median language (also Medean or Medic) was the language of the Medes. It is an Old Iranian language and classified as belonging to the Northwestern Iranian subfamily, which includes many other languages such as Old Azeri, Talysh, Gilaki, Mazandarani, Zaza–Gorani, Kurdish, and Baluchi.

Attestation
Median is attested only by numerous loanwords in Old Persian. Nothing is known of its grammar, "but it shares important phonological isoglosses with Avestan, rather than Old Persian. Under the Median rule . . . Median must to some extent have been the official Iranian language in western Iran".

No documents dating to Median times have been preserved, and it is not known what script these texts might have been in. "So far only one inscription of pre-Achaemenid times (a bronze plaque) has been found on the territory of Media. This is a cuneiform inscription composed in Akkadian, perhaps in the 8th century BCE, but no Median names are mentioned in it."

Identity
A distinction from other ethnolinguistic groups such as the Persians is evident primarily in foreign sources, such as from mid-9th-century BCE Assyrian cuneiform sources and from Herodotus' mid-5th-century BCE secondhand account of the Perso-Median conflict. It is not known what the native name of the Median language was (just like for all other Old Iranian languages) or whether the Medes themselves nominally distinguished it from the languages of other Iranian peoples.

Median is "presumably" a substrate of Old Persian. The Median element is readily identifiable because it did not share in the developments that were particular to Old Persian. Median forms "are found only in personal or geographical names... and some are typically from religious vocabulary and so could in principle also be influenced by Avestan.... Sometimes, both Median and Old Persian forms are found, which gave Old Persian a somewhat confusing and inconsistent look: 'horse,' for instance, is [attested in Old Persian as] both asa (OPers.) and aspa (Med.)."

Using comparative phonology of proper names attested in Old Persian, Roland Kent notes several other Old Persian words that appear to be borrowings from Median: for example, taxma, 'brave', as in the proper name Taxmaspada. Diakonoff includes paridaiza, 'paradise'; vazraka, 'great' and xshayathiya, 'royal'. In the mid-5th century BCE, Herodotus (Histories 1.110) noted that spaka is the Median word for a female dog. This term and meaning are preserved in living Iranian languages such as Talyshi.

In the 1st century BCE, Strabo (c. 64BCE–24CE) would note a relationship between the various Iranian peoples and their languages: "[From] beyond the Indus... Ariana is extended so as to include some part of Persia, Media, and the north of Bactria and Sogdiana; for these nations speak nearly the same language." (Geography, 15.2.1-15.2.8)

Traces of the (later) dialects of Media (not to be confused with the Median language) are preserved in the compositions of the fahlaviyat genre, verse composed in the old dialects of the Pahla/Fahla regions of Iran's northwest. Consequently, these compositions have "certain linguistic affinities" with Parthian, but the surviving specimens (which are from the 9th to 18th centuries CE) are much influenced by Persian. For an enumeration of linguistic characteristics and vocabulary "deserving mention," see . The use of fahla (from Middle Persian pahlaw) to denote Media is attested from late Arsacid times so it reflects the pre-Sassanid use of the word to denote "Parthia", which, during Arsacid times, included most of Media.

Predecessor of modern Iranian languages
A number of modern Iranian languages spoken today have had medieval stages with attestations found in Classical and Early Modern Persian sources. G. Windfuhr believes that the "modern [Iranian] languages of Azarbaijan and Central Iran, located in ancient Media and Atropatene, are 'Median' dialects" and that those languages "continue the lost local and regional language" of Old Median, and bear similarity to "Medisms in Old Persian". The term Pahlav/Fahlav (see fahlaviyat) in traditional medieval Persian sources is also used to refer to regionalisms in Persian poetry from western Iran that reflect the period of Parthian rule of those regions, but Windfuhr also ascribes some of these to older Median influence. and their languages "being survivals of the Median dialects have certain linguistic affinities with Parthian". The most notable New Median languages and dialects are spoken in central Iran 
especially around Kashan.

References

Northwestern Iranian languages
Extinct languages of Asia
Language
Languages extinct in the 6th century
Languages attested from the 6th century BC